The 2015 Brisbane International was a tournament of the 2015 ATP World Tour and 2015 WTA Tour. It was played on outdoor hard courts in Brisbane, Queensland, Australia. It was the sixth edition of the tournament and took place at the Queensland Tennis Centre in Tennyson. It was held from 4 to 11 January 2015. It was part of the Australian Open Series in preparation for the first Grand Slam of the year.

It was announced on 1 September 2014 that Roger Federer had again committed to the event. Federer and Sharapova won the singles titles.

Points and prize money

Point distribution

Prize money 

1Qualifiers prize money is also the Round of 32 prize money.
*per team

ATP singles main-draw entrants

Seeds 

1 Rankings as of December 29, 2014.

Other entrants 
The following players received wildcards into the singles main draw:
  James Duckworth
  Thanasi Kokkinakis
  John Millman

The following player received entry using a protected ranking into the singles main draw:
  Jürgen Melzer

The following players received entry from the qualifying draw:
  Łukasz Kubot
  Denis Kudla
  Marius Copil
  Rhyne Williams

Withdrawals
Before the tournament 
  Marin Čilić → replaced by  Andrey Golubev
  Donald Young → replaced by  Marinko Matosevic
  Juan Martín del Potro → replaced by  Sam Groth

ATP doubles main-draw entrants

Seeds 

1 Rankings as of December 29, 2014.

Other entrants 
The following pairs received wildcards into the doubles main draw:
  Grigor Dimitrov /  Thanasi Kokkinakis
  James Duckworth /  Marinko Matosevic

WTA singles main-draw entrants

Seeds 

1 Rankings as of January 5, 2015.

Other entrants 
The following players received wildcards into the singles main draw:
  Jarmila Gajdošová
  Ajla Tomljanović

The following player received entry using a protected ranking into the singles main draw:
  Bethanie Mattek-Sands

The following players received entry from the qualifying draw:
  Madison Brengle
  Daria Gavrilova
  Yaroslava Shvedova
  Lesia Tsurenko

The following player received entry as lucky loser:
  Alla Kudryavtseva

Withdrawals
Before the tournament
  Camila Giorgi (mouth injury) →  replaced by Bethanie Mattek-Sands
  Garbiñe Muguruza (ankle injury) →  replaced by Alla Kudryavtseva

WTA doubles main-draw entrants

Seeds 

1 Rankings as of December 29, 2014.

Other entrants 
The following pairs received wildcards into the doubles main draw:
  Ana Ivanovic /  Angelique Kerber
  Mirjana Lučić-Baroni /  Lisa Raymond
  Daria Gavrilova /  Storm Sanders

Withdrawals
 During the tournament
  Ana Ivanovic (abdominal injury)

Champions

Men's singles 

  Roger Federer def.  Milos Raonic, 6–4, 6–7(2–7), 6–4.

Women's singles 

  Maria Sharapova def.  Ana Ivanovic, 6–7(4–7), 6–3, 6–3.

Men's doubles 

  Jamie Murray /  John Peers def.  Alexandr Dolgopolov /  Kei Nishikori, 6–3, 7–6(7–4).

Women's doubles 

  Martina Hingis /  Sabine Lisicki def.  Caroline Garcia /  Katarina Srebotnik, 6–2, 7–5.

References

External links 
 

 
Brisbane International
Brisbane International
Brisbane International
January 2015 sports events in Australia